Mahavira may refer to:

 Mahavira, Jain Tirthankara
 Another name for Hanuman, Hindu god
 Mahāvīra (mathematician), Jain mathematician